Mirko Matías Serrano Panes (born 14 November 1991) is a Chilean footballer who currently plays for Primera B de Chile side San Marcos de Arica as a midfielder.

References

External links
 

1990s births
Living people
People from Chañaral Province
People from Atacama Region
Chilean footballers
Cobresal footballers
Deportes Melipilla footballers
Lota Schwager footballers
Unión La Calera footballers
Magallanes footballers
Deportes Magallanes footballers
Deportes Santa Cruz footballers
San Marcos de Arica footballers
Chilean Primera División players
Segunda División Profesional de Chile players
Primera B de Chile players
Association football midfielders